This is a list of the Sites of Special Scientific Interest (SSSIs) in Herefordshire, England. In England the body responsible for designating SSSIs is Natural England, which chooses a site because of its fauna, flora, geological or physiographical features.
, there are 83 sites designated in this Area of Search. There are 21 sites with a geological interest, and 62 listed for biological interest. Four sites are designated for both reasons.

Natural England took over the role of designating and managing SSSIs from English Nature in October 2006 when it was formed from the amalgamation of English Nature, parts of the Countryside Agency and the Rural Development Service.

For other counties, see List of SSSIs by Area of Search.

Sites

Notes
Data rounded to one decimal place.
Grid reference is based on the British national grid reference system, also known as OSGB36, and is the system used by the Ordnance Survey.
Link to maps using the Nature on the Map service provided by Natural England.

References

Natural England Reports and Statistics data for Hereford and Worcester

Sites of Special Scientific Interest in Herefordshire
Herefordshire
Sites of Special